The American Alpine Club (AAC) is a non-profit member organization with more than 24,000 members. Its vision is to create "a united community of competent climbers and healthy climbing landscapes." The Club is housed in the American Mountaineering Center (AMC) in Golden, Colorado.

Through its members, the AAC advocates for American climbers domestically and around the world; provides grants and volunteer opportunities to protect and conserve climbing areas; hosts local and national climbing festivals and events; cares for the nation's leading climbing library and mountaineering museum; manages the Hueco Rock Ranch, New River Gorge Campground, and Grand Teton Climbers' Ranch as part of a larger lodging network for climbers; and annually gives about $100,000 toward climbing, conservation, and research grants that fund adventurers who travel the world. It also maintains regional sections—with both regional staff and volunteers—throughout the United States.

The AAC publishes two journals, The American Alpine Journal (AAJ) and Accidents in North American Mountaineering (Accidents), and a Guidebook to Membership annually. Collections of these journals, along with tens of thousands of other climbing-related publications and mountaineering literature, can be found in the Henry S. Hall, Jr. American Alpine Club Library, also located in the AMC. The AAC is a 501(c)(3) organization supported by gifts and grants from individuals, corporations and foundations, member dues, and income from lodging, publications and restricted endowments.

History 

Founded by Arctic explorer, zoologist and geographer Angelo Heilprin, the American Alpine Club was established in 1902 and had 45 founding members. These original members were primarily from the East Coast, although a handful resided in the Midwest, Washington, and Alaska. Among them was Annie Smith Peck and the AAC's first president, Charles Ernest Fay, who was also a founding member of the Appalachian Mountain Club.

The Club was primarily East Coast-oriented for the first half-century of its existence; its headquarters remained in New York until 1993, when the Board unanimously decided to move the AAC to its current location in Golden, Colorado. The Club is housed in the American Mountaineering Center, whose other tenants include the Colorado Mountain Club and Outward Bound.

The AAC is historically and contemporarily associated with a number of other American and international organizations. It was a founding member of the International Climbing and Mountaineering Federation (Union International des Associations d’Alpinism, UIAA) in 1932 and the Arctic Institute of North America in 1948.

Library 

The AAC Library was established in 1916 by a gift from American mountaineer Henry Montagnier, whose collection was added to over time by various early club members. The library was initially focused primarily on the Alps. From 1916 until 1929, the library was housed in the New York Public Library, which devoted an entire room to the AAC. During this time, the library grew to include contributions from many members, as well as cultural artifacts from their various expeditions to the Himalayas and elsewhere. In 1941, the AAC purchased a renovated firehouse in Manhattan to house the growing library.

When the AAC moved its permanent headquarters to Golden in 1993, the library, too, moved to its current location in the basement of the American Mountaineering Center, the Henry S. Hall Jr. American Alpine Club Library. Soon after this move, AAC member John Boyle – part of the American expedition that first ascended Mt. Everest's Kangshung Face in 1983 – donated the John M. Boyle Himalayan Library, which included 2,500 books, 400 expedition reports, and 100 videos and films. Many items are autographed by the expedition members who wrote them. Most recently, in 2008, a private collector donated 30,000 bound volumes of the Central Asia Library. Many of the Library's original volumes are housed in the current library's Rare Books Room.

Today, AAC members can search the Library's website for literature and guidebooks and have items shipped to them from Golden. The library also features an online Guidebook Finder which allows users to search for climbing guidebooks by location.

Publications

American Alpine Journal
First published in 1929, the American Alpine Journal (AAJ) is an annual publication which includes news on groundbreaking first ascents, trip reports from high-altitude ascents the world over, and various resources—including book reviews, maps, and topography.

Accidents in North American Mountaineering
For this annual publication, the AAC collaborates with the Alpine Club of Canada to cover accidents caused by inadequate protection, clothing or equipment; inexperience; errors in judgment; and climbers’ pursuing of objectives beyond their abilities. Published with the intention of informing climbers and preventing subsequent accidents, each report includes a detailed analysis of what went wrong and what precautions could be taken to avoid a similar accident.

Guidebook to Membership
The Guidebook to Membership, first published and distributed in 2012, contains information about the benefits associated with membership in the AAC. The Guidebook is also available online.

Membership in the AAC
From the time of its founding until the mid-1980s, candidates for membership in the AAC were required to submit a list of notable ascents at high altitude or other “significant alpine accomplishments.” The phrase “... or the equivalent” appeared at the end of this bylaw, allowing the Board to elect artists and writers with little tangible experience, but for the most part, membership in the Club meant that a person had already achieved a great deal in the world of mountaineering. Today, the AAC has no prerequisites for membership.

Notable members
Another notable founding member is naturalist, prolific writer, and Sierra Club co-founder John Muir, who is considered by many to be the founder of the wilderness preservation movement. Muir also served as the Club's second president, and was instrumental in bringing the AAC to a central role in environmental conservation in the United States.

Lyman Spitzer, noted theoretical physicist and astronomer was a member of the club. In 1965, Spitzer and Donald Morton became the first men to climb Mount Thor , located in Auyuittuq National Park, on Baffin Island, Nunavut, Canada. As a member of the American Alpine Club Spitzer established the "Lyman Spitzer Cutting Edge Climbing Award" which gives $12,000 to several mountain climbing expeditions annually.

Mary Jobe Akeley, who explored the Selkirk Mountains and much of British Columbia between 1907 and 1914, was an early member.

Current officers 
As of 2022, the board of directors consist of the following:

References

Further reading 
Fay, Charles E., Allen H. Bent, Howard Palmer, James M. Thorington, Andrew J. Kauffman, and William Lowell Putnam. A Century of American Alpinism: 2002. Golden: American Alpine Club, 2002.

External links
American Alpine Club

Climbing organizations
Climbing
Alpine clubs
Mountaineering in the United States